Silvio Ferrini (born 28 August 1949) is an Italian rower. He competed in the men's double sculls event at the 1976 Summer Olympics.

References

1949 births
Living people
Italian male rowers
Olympic rowers of Italy
Rowers at the 1976 Summer Olympics
Place of birth missing (living people)